Bida si Mister, Bida si Misis is a Philippine sitcom on ABS-CBN which aired from November 16, 2002 to February 8, 2005, replacing Mary D' Potter and was replaced by Bora. It is a sequel of family-romance comedy Kaya ni Mister, Kaya ni Misis, and reaired again on Jeepney TV every Wednesdays at 9:00 PM to 10:00 PM.

Cast of characters
 Vhong Navarro as Bok Tyson
 Maricel Soriano as Mary Magtanggol
 Cesar Montano as Buboy Magtanggol
 Asia Agcaoili
 Emman Abeleda as Jun Jun
 Jane Oineza as Jackie
 Hyubs Azarcon as Puto
 Earl Ignacio as Mac
 George Javier as Chief Dyords Pipay
 Shaina Magdayao as Shaina
 Smokey Manaloto as Wayne
 Bearwin Meily as Totoy
 Jenny Miller as Lovely
 John Wayne Sace as Jun-Jun's classmate
 Sergio Garcia as Jun-Jun's classmate
 Mhyco Aquino as Jun-Jun's classmate
 Mico Aytona as Jun-Jun's classmate
 Rayver Cruz as Jun-Jun's classmate
 Alwyn Uytingco as Jun-Jun's classmate
 Froilan Sales
 Gloria Sevilla as Tiya Ina
 Alwyn Uytingco as Sherwin
 Empress Schuck as Empress
 Bentong
 Mahal

See also
 List of programs broadcast by ABS-CBN
 Kaya ni Mister, Kaya ni Misis

External links
 

ABS-CBN original programming
Philippine television sitcoms
2002 Philippine television series debuts
2005 Philippine television series endings
Filipino-language television shows